The Vorkuta Corrective Labor Camp, commonly known as the Vorkuta Gulag or Vorkutlag (Воркутлаг), was a major GULAG labor camp in the Soviet Union located in Vorkuta, Komi Autonomous Soviet Socialist Republic, Russian Soviet Federative Socialist Republic from 1932 to 1962.

The Vorkuta Gulag was one of the largest camps in the GULAG system with 73,000 prisoners at its peak in 1951, containing Soviet and foreign prisoners including prisoners of war, dissidents, political prisoners ("enemies of the state") and common criminals who were used as forced labor in the construction of Coal mines, coal mining works and Forestry. The camp was administered by the Joint State Political Directorate from 1932 to 1934, the NKVD from 1934 to 1946 and the Ministry of Internal Affairs (Soviet Union) from 1946 until its closure in 1962. The Vorkuta Gulag was the site of the Vorkuta Uprising in July 1953.

History

Establishment of Vorkutlag, 1932 

In 1930 the geologist Georgy Chernov (1906–2009) discovered substantial coal fields by the river Vorkuta. Georgy Chernov's father, the geologist Alexander Chernov (1877–1963), promoted the development of the Pechora coal basin, which included the Vorkuta fields. With this discovery the coal-mining industry started in the Komi ASSR. (At the time only the southern parts of the field were included in the Komi ASSR. The northern part, including Vorkuta, belonged to the Nenets Autonomous Okrug of Arkhangelsk Oblast.) In 1931 a geologist settlement was established by the coal field, with most of the workers being inmates of the Ukhta-Pechora Camp GULAG. The town of Vorkuta was established on 4 January 1936 to support the camp, which was constructed to exploit the resources of the Pechora Coal Basin, the second largest coal basin in the Soviet Union. The camp was constructed mainly for Coal Mining and Forestry, There were approximately 132 sub-camps in the Vorkuta Gulag system during the height of its use in the Soviet prison system. Town status was granted to Vorkuta on November 26, 1943.

Vorkutlag, 1932-1962 
in 1937 the construction of the Pechora Mainline started, the new railway was an addition to the Northern Railway (Russia) which connected Moscow to Vorkuta, Konosha, Kotlas, the camps of Inta and other Northern parts of European Russia, the Railway was built by prisoners from the Gulag and was completed in 1941. From 1939, Polish prisoners were held at Vorkuta following the Occupation of Poland until the German invasion of the Soviet Union in 1941. Vorkuta was then also used to hold German prisoners of war captured on the Eastern Front in World War II as well as criminals, Soviet citizens and those from Soviet-allied countries deemed to be dissidents and enemies of the state during the Soviet era, US soldier were also held in the camp, a majority of whom were captured from the Korean War. Many prisoners didn't survive in the camp and died by freezing to death in the cold climate, dying from starvation as food was scarce in Vorkuta, or the inmates worked themselves to death. Prisoners were given Rye Bread, Buckwheat, a little meat and fish and potatoes as food but in very little amounts, Prisoners  resorted to killing rats or stray dogs for food. Self harm was common in the camp, if an inmate sustained an injury they would be sent to the hospital where conditions were better, The average amount of working time in the camp was 16 hours a day for every inmate.

The Vorkuta Uprising, 1953 
The Vorkuta uprising occurred at the Vorkuta Gulag from 19 July 1953 to 1 August 1953, when inmates at various camps who were forced to work in the region's coal mines went on strike. The uprising—initially in the form of a passive walkout—began on or before July 19, 1953, at a single "department" and quickly spread to five others. Initial demands—to give inmates access to a state attorney and due justice—quickly changed to political demands. Even without foreign assistance, strikes at nearby sites were clearly visible as the wheels of the mine headframes stopped rotating, and word was spread by trains, which had slogans painted by prisoners on the sides, and whose crews spread news. The total number of inmates on strike reached 18,000. The inmates remained static within the barbed wire perimeters.

For a week following the initial strike the camp administration apparently did nothing; they increased perimeter guards but took no forceful action against inmates. The mines were visited by State Attorney of the USSR, Roman Rudenko, Internal Troops Commander, Ivan Maslennikov, and other top brass from Moscow. The generals spoke to the inmates who sat idle in camp courtyards, peacefully. However, on July 26 the mob stormed the maximum security punitive compound, releasing 77 of its inmates. The commissars from Moscow remained in Vorkuta, planning their response. The inmates demanded lower production targets, wages and to be allowed to write more than two letters a year. Concessions were made, including being allowed to write more than two letters a year and to be allowed one visitor a year but the inmates demanded more. On July 31 camp chief Derevyanko started mass arrests of "saboteurs"; inmates responded with barricades. The next day, on August 1, after further bloodless clashes between inmates and guards, Derevyanko ordered direct fire at the mob resulting in the deaths of at least 53 workers and injuring 135 (many of them, deprived of medical help, died later) although estimates vary. According to Aleksandr Solzhenitsyn, there were 66 killed. Among those shot was the Latvian Catholic priest Jānis Mendriks.

Closing of Vorkuta, 1962 
The Vorkuta camp was liquidated by order of the USSR Ministry of Internal Affairs and eventually closed in 1962, the closure of GULAGS started when Nikita Khrushchev came into power, Khrushchev started a series of reforms known as De-Stalinization which caused the closure of most GULAGS. About 2 Million Prisoners had gone to Vorkutlag from 1932 until the closure in 1962, the amount of deaths in the camp were estimated to be 200,000. Most prisoners were released after the closure of Vorkuta but Large numbers of Soviet citizens who were former prisoners remained living in Vorkuta, either due to the restrictions on their settlement or their poor financial situation, or having nowhere to go. Memorial, a Russian human rights organization that focuses on recording and publicising the human rights violations of the Soviet Union's totalitarianism, estimates that of the 40,000 people collecting state pensions in the Vorkuta area, 32,000 are former gulag inmates or their descendants.

Location 
Vorkuta GULAG was located in the Komi Autonomous Soviet Socialist Republic in the Russian Soviet Federative Socialist Republic, Soviet Union. It was 160 km above the arctic circle and roughly 50 km from the Ural mountain range. since the camp was located in the very northern part of Russia, the harsh climate was hard to endure. 

Vorkuta was extremely cold since it was located in the very northern part of European Russia in the Arctic circle. The average temperatures from the Winter to summer being -25 °C (-13 °F) to -13 °C (8.6 °F) and reaching as low as −52 °C (−61 °F). Midnight sun or "Polar Days" was common in Vorkuta where the sun wouldn't set for three months which greatly affected the prisoners in Vorkutlag, prisoners weren't given good enough clothing to have survived the climate and many froze to death.

Vorkuta in the present day 
Vorkuta is now a town in the Komi Republic, Russia. The remains of the Gulag are partly or almost entirely destroyed. Vorkuta is heavily declining in population and is slowly being abandoned, after the Dissolution of the Soviet Union, Mining companies moved farther into the southern regions of Russia. A majority of the population in Vorkuta worked in the nearby coal mines, after the coal mine companies moved many lost jobs and started moving out of Vorkuta. Today, Vorkuta is barely inhabited with a small population. the towns estimated population is about 50,000 and is still decreasing.

Notable inmates

 Heinz Baumkötter (1912-2001) SS concentration camp doctor in Mauthausen concentration camp, arrested in 1947, released in 1956.
 Walter Ciszek (1904-1984): American Catholic priest and memoirist arrested in 1941, released in 1955 - survived.
 Shlomo Dykman (1917–1965): Jewish-Polish translator and classical scholar.
 Valentín González (1904–1983): Spanish Communist and Spanish Republican Army brigade commander during the Spanish Civil War – successfully escaped in 1949.
 Anton Kaindl (1902–1948): SS commandant of Sachsenhausen concentration camp between 1942 and 1945, died in 1948.
 Jaan Kross (1920–2007): Estonian writer.
 Jānis Mendriks (1907–1953): Latvian Catholic priest, killed in the uprising.
 Der Nister (1884–1950): Yiddish writer.
 Eric Pleasants (1913-1998): British national who joined the Waffen-SS serving in the British Free Corps during the Second World War.
 John H. Noble (1923–2007): American survivor of the Soviet Gulag system (released after ~10 years) who wrote two books about experiences there.
 Homer Harold Cox, kidnapped in East Berlin in 1949 and released in 1953, together with US Merchant Marine Leland Towers, Americans in the Gulag.
 Zvi Preigerzon (1900–1969): Hebrew writer and coal enrichment scientist.
 Nikolay Punin (1888–1953): Russian art scholar, curator and writer. Common law husband of poetess Anna Akhmatova.
 Georgy Safarov (1891–1942): Bolshevik revolutionary, member of the Communist Party of the Soviet Union – executed.
 Günter Stempel (1908–1981): East German politician and a member of the Liberal Democratic Party.
 Edward Buca (Russian Wikipedia page: https://ru.wikipedia.org/wiki/Буц,_Эдвард_Антонович). (1926-2013): Polish Home Army soldier who was arrested in August 1945, released in 1958.
 Joseph Scholmer (German Wikipedia Page: https://de.wikipedia.org/wiki/Joseph_Scholmer) (1913-1995): doctor working for the Central Health Authority in Berlin, Accused of being an agent of the Gestapo and the American and British Secret Services (Office of Strategic Services and MI6) in May of 1949, arrested in 1949, released in 1953.
 Alla Tumanova (1931-): student at Lenin State Pedagogical Institute, Arrested at age 20 in 1951, released in 1956 - currently alive.

Notable guards
 Zoya Voskresenskaya, the chief of the Special Section of Vorkuta prison-camp, who served between 1955 and 1956.

In popular culture
"Return from Workuta", track n. 3 of the album 1978 Gli Dei Se Ne Vanno, Gli Arrabbiati Restano! (1978) by the Italian progressive rock, jazz fusion, electronic, experimental group Area – International POPular Group, most commonly known as Area or AreA. The song is vocal and instrumental only and is accompanied by a text written by the singer Demetrio Stratos depicting portraits of people returning from the work camp.  
"Red Snow", the second segment of the twenty-first episode of the first season (1985–86) of the television series The Twilight Zone, features Vorkuta as the sanctuary of a vampire community.
 In the 2010 video game Call of Duty: Black Ops, the player character, an American named Alex Mason, is imprisoned at Vorkuta from 1961 to 1963 after being captured in Cuba during the Bay of Pigs invasion. He participates in a prisoner uprising along with his ally Viktor Reznov.

See also 

Vorkuta
Vorkuta uprising
Vorkuta mine disaster
Gulag
Kolyma
NKVD
Red Army
Soviet Union

References

Further reading

Camps of the Gulag
1932 establishments in the Soviet Union
Komi Republic
Gulag
Gulag uprisings